The John Deere Model D tractor was a large standard tractor produced by John Deere from 1923 to 1953. Unlike other John Deere letter-series tractors, it kept the "D" designation throughout production, and never changed to a number designation. The D had the longest model run of any John Deere tractor. It was succeeded by the John Deere Model R.

Description and production
The Model D was first produced in 1923. It was a heavy standard tractor with fixed wheel widths, as opposed to the adjustable wheels of a row-crop tractor. The D was initially equipped with a two-cylinder side-by-side  engine, of  displacement, updated in 1927 to a  engine. Early models had a two-speed transmission. In 1930 the engine was increased in power, and in 1934 a three-speed transmission was introduced. Specialized orchard models (DO), half-track and fully-tracked crawler models were also produced, along with the DI industrial tractor. By 1935 steel wheels were being phased out in favor of rubber wheels on most models, and had never been used for the DI models, which required higher road travel speeds than could be borne with steel wheels. The D was equipped as an all-fuel tractor, able to operate with gasoline, kerosene, or distillate. All Ds were manufactured at the John Deere factory in Waterloo, Iowa, where 55,929 were built.

In 1939 the D received the Deere brand-wide styling changes designed by Henry Dreyfuss, with updated hoods and grilles. An optional power take-off was offered. After the longest production run for any single model made by John Deere, the Model D was replaced by the Model R in 1949.

References

External links
 Test 350: John Deere D at the Nebraska Tractor Test Laboratory

John Deere tractors